Gasteria baylissiana, Suurberg gasteria, is  a species of succulent flowering plant in the family Asphodelaceae, native to the Eastern Cape, South Africa.

Description

These tubercles are one of the easiest ways of identifying this species. In the shade, the leaves become elongated; while in sunnier conditions they remain short and compact. The plant produces offsets from the base, forming clumps, and also grows from broken leaves which root and develop shoots.

It is often confused with Gasteria armstrongii or Gasteria carinata var. verrucosa, which both have a similar squat, retuse, distichous growth form. However G. baylissiana can be distinguished by its dense white "misty" speckling of tiny tubercles, and by its smaller, distinctively-shaped flowers.

Distribution
This species, a close relative of Gasteria bicolor, is restricted to a deep gorge within the Albany Thicket of Addo Elephant National Park, South Africa.

Cultivation
In cultivation in the UK, this plant does not survive temperatures below , so requires the protection of glass during the winter months. It may be grown in similar conditions to other cacti and succulents. It has gained the Royal Horticultural Society’s Award of Garden Merit.

References

Flora of the Cape Provinces
baylissiana